Skull Fork is a stream in the U.S. state of Ohio.

According to legend, local Indians had kidnapped and murdered some individuals whose skulls were found near this creek.

See also
List of rivers of Ohio

References

Rivers of Belmont County, Ohio
Rivers of Guernsey County, Ohio
Rivers of Harrison County, Ohio
Rivers of Ohio